The 2020 Russian Cup Final was the 28th Russian Cup Final, the final match of the 2019–20 Russian Cup. It was played at Yekaterinburg Arena in Yekaterinburg, Russia, on 25 July 2020, contested by Zenit St. Petersburg and Khimki. Zenit won the match 1–0, with the only goal coming from Artem Dzyuba's penalty kick in the 84th minute. 

The game was originally scheduled for 13 May, but was delayed due to the COVID-19 pandemic in Russia. For the same reason, attendance was limited to 10% of the arena's capacity and the teams were allowed to make 5 substitutions instead of customary 3.

Since Zenit had already qualified for the 2020–21 UEFA Champions League, Dynamo Moscow will enter the 2020–21 UEFA Europa League in the second qualifying round.

Route to the final

Zenit Saint Petersburg

Khimki

Match

Details

References

Russian Cup finals
Russian Cup
Cup
FC Zenit Saint Petersburg matches
FC Khimki matches